Lee Dong-Geun (born 28 November 1988) is a South Korean football midfielder, who played for Gyeongnam FC in the K-League from 2011–2012.

Club career 

Lee was one of Gyeongnam FC's draft picks for the 2011 season.   Choi made his professional debut on 17 April 2011, as a late substitute in the dying seconds of Gyeongnam's league match against the Chunnam Dragons.  Lee also appeared as a late substitute in Gyeongnam's loss to Ulsan Hyundai FC in the semi-final of the 2011 K-League Cup, scoring his first professional goal within a few minutes of getting on the pitch.

Club career statistics

References

External links 

1988 births
Living people
Association football midfielders
South Korean footballers
Gyeongnam FC players
K League 1 players
Korea National League players